Barry Banks is an English former professional rugby league footballer who played as a  or  in the 1970s and 1980s. He played at representative level for England, and at club level for York, Hull F.C. and Hunslet.

Playing career

York
Banks played , and scored 2-goals in York's 8–18 defeat by Bradford Northern in the 1978–79 Yorkshire Cup Final during the 1978–79 season at Headingley, Leeds on Saturday 28 October 1978.

Hull
Banks was transferred from York to Hull in October 1980 for a fee of £20,000.

Banks played  in Hull's 12–4 victory over Hull Kingston Rovers in the 1981–82 John Player Trophy Final during the 1981–82 season at Headingley, Leeds on Saturday 23 January 1982.

International honours
Banks won a cap for England while at York in 1979 against France (sub).

References

External links
(archived by web.archive.org) Stats → PastPlayers → B at hullfc.com
(archived by web.archive.org) Statistics at hullfc.com

England national rugby league team players
English rugby league players
Hull F.C. players
Hunslet R.L.F.C. players
Living people
Place of birth missing (living people)
Rugby league centres
Rugby league fullbacks
Rugby league five-eighths
Year of birth missing (living people)
York Wasps players